Cytisus hirsutus (clustered broom or hairy broom) is a perennial plant belonging to the genus Cytisus of the family Fabaceae.

Description
The stem is more or less ascendent, woody in the lower part, branched, with ascending annual and herbaceous branches (suffruticose) with hairs 3 millimeters long (hence the Latin name hirsutus of this species, meaning hairy). The flowers are initially orange-yellow, then tend to be colored with reddish brown. The flowering period extends from April through June.

Gallery

Distribution
This plant occurs in Turkey, Austria, Czechoslovakia, Hungary, Switzerland, Albania, Bulgaria, former Yugoslavia, Greece, Italy, Romania and France.

Habitat
These plants can be found on calcareous and arid environments, such as dry meadows and slopes at the edge of the woods.

References

 Pignatti S. - Flora d'Italia - Edagricole – 1982. vol. III
 Tutin, T. G. et al., eds. 1964–1980. Flora europaea

External links
 Biolib
 Cytisus hirsutus

Hirsutus
Flora of Italy